The Gay Defender is a lost 1927 American silent drama film directed by Gregory La Cava and written by Ray Harris, Grover Jones, Herman J. Mankiewicz, George Marion Jr., Sam Mintz, and Kenneth Raisbeck. The film stars Richard Dix, Thelma Todd, Fred Kohler, Jerry Mandy, Robert Brower, Harry Holden, and Fred Esmelton. The film was released on December 10, 1927, by Paramount Pictures.

Cast  
Richard Dix as Joaquin Murrieta
Thelma Todd as Ruth Ainsworth
Fred Kohler as Jake Hamby
Jerry Mandy as Chombo
Robert Brower as Ferdinand Murrieta
Harry Holden as Padre Sebastian
Fred Esmelton as Commissioner Ainsworth
Frances Raymond as Aunt Emily
Ernie Adams as Bart Hamby
Augustina López as Extra (uncredited)

References

External links

Stills at richarddix.org

1927 films
Lost drama films
1927 drama films
Paramount Pictures films
Films directed by Gregory La Cava
American black-and-white films
Lost American films
American silent feature films
1920s English-language films
1920s American films
Silent American drama films
1927 lost films